Volodymyr Volodymyrovych Shatskykh (born 2 July 1981 in Molodohvardiysk, Ukrainian SSR) is a Ukrainian former Olympic Greco-Roman wrestler who represented his country at the 2004 and 2008 Summer Olympics. He won his division at the 2006 World Championships.

References

External links
 

Living people
1981 births
Ukrainian male sport wrestlers
Olympic wrestlers of Ukraine
Wrestlers at the 2004 Summer Olympics
Wrestlers at the 2008 Summer Olympics
People from Molodohvardiysk
World Wrestling Championships medalists
European Wrestling Championships medalists
Sportspeople from Luhansk Oblast
20th-century Ukrainian people
21st-century Ukrainian people